Stryukovo is a rural locality (a village) in Verknevarzhenskoye Rural Settlement, Velikoustyugsky District, Vologda Oblast, Russia. The population was 37 as of 2002.

Geography 
Stryukovo is located 71 km southeast of Veliky Ustyug (the district's administrative centre) by road. Makarovo is the nearest rural locality.

References 

Rural localities in Velikoustyugsky District